Mamuzai is a Pashtun tribe of Orakzai District in Pakistan. Several Mamuzai live in Kohat, Peshawar, Islamabad, and in other areas in Pakistan. Mamozai also has sub-tribes.This is not to be confused with the region along the Pakistan border, Mamuzai. As of 2016, the returning of displaced individuals back to Mamuzai has been started.

References 

Karlani Pashtun tribes